Wildmoos is an area in the central Inn valley in North Tyrol and a village in the municipality of Telfs in the district of Innsbruck Land.

Geography 
Wildmoos lies  beyond Innsbruck on the Seefeld Plateau above the Inn, at around 1260 , near Seefeld.

The area encompasses just under 30 scattered houses; today most of the land is covered by the Seefeld-Wildmoos Golf Course and the alpine meadow of Wildmoosalm.

Nature 

The two areas are separated by forest. They are both karst phenomena.

Seefeld-Wildmoos Golf Course 
The region has been developed today into an 18-hole golf course. The golf club is a member of the Leading Golf Courses Austria and has close links to the nearby 5-star hotel, the Interalpen Tyrol.

References 
 

Golf in Austria
Mieming Range
Cities and towns in Innsbruck-Land District